Dimosies Scheseis (Greek: Δημόσιες Σχέσεις; English: Public relations) is the sixth studio album by Greek singer-songwriter and record producer Nikos Karvelas, released by CBS Records Greece in 1988. In 1996, a remastered version of the album was released.

Track listing

External links 
 Official site

1988 albums
Albums produced by Nikos Karvelas
Greek-language albums
Nikos Karvelas albums
Sony Music Greece albums